Egypt, Alabama may refer to:
Egypt, Bibb County, Alabama, a ghost town
Egypt, Etowah County, Alabama, a census-designated place
Egypt, Marshall County, Alabama, an unincorporated community